Tejara is a historical place in Kutch district of Gujarat, India.

Ruins
The ruins are situated three miles south of Amrapar. They contain a pond with sixty-five memorial stones, and the ruins of a Mahadev temple on a platform fifteen feet by thirty six in a courtyard 100 feet by 82. Only six square pillars eight feet long, and part of the back wall and a weather-worn mutilated bull, remain. The stones are yellow without cement and with much carving. The ruins are said to be as old as Vagham-Chavdagadh (1200- 1250). According to a local couplet, 63 bushels (3 khandis) of 6d. (1 Kutch kori) pieces and 31 bushels (1 khandis) of 3d. ( kori) pieces are hidden at Ayar, Mayar, and Tejara.

References

 This article incorporates Public Domain text from 

Villages in Kutch district